Wei Xiaoyuan (born August 25, 2004) is a Chinese artistic gymnast. She is best known for her work on the uneven bars, where she is a two-time world champion (2021, 2022), the 2022 Asian champion, and a two-time Chinese national silver medalist (2021, 2022). In the all-around, she is the 2021 Chinese National Games champion and the 2020 Chinese national silver medalist. On the junior level, she is a three-time Junior World Championships medalist and the 2019 National Youth Games all-around champion.

Career

Junior

2018 
In February Wei competed at the WOGA Classic in the United States where she placed thirteenth in the all-around but recorded the third highest score on balance beam.  In April she competed at the 2018 City of Jesolo Trophy in Italy, where she placed seventh on the balance beam and helped China place fifth in the team competition.

The following month Wei competed at the senior-level Chinese Championships representing the Guangxi province. She placed fourteenth in the all-around and her team placed eleventh.  In June, Wei competed at the Chinese Junior National Championships where she finished second in the 14 and under division behind Guan Chenchen. During event finals she won silver on uneven bars behind Wang Jingying, finished seventh on balance beam, and won gold on floor exercise.

2019 
In March Wei competed at the 2019 City of Jesolo Trophy where she placed fifth in the all-around, on balance beam, and on floor exercise and placed seventh on uneven bars.  In May she competed at the Chinese Championships where she placed tenth in the all-around.  Wei was later selected to represent China at the inaugural Junior World Championships alongside Ou Yushan and Guan Chenchen. While there she helped China finish second in team final, behind Russia and ahead of the United States. Individually, Wei finished sixth in the all-around and won two medals in the event finals: silver on balance beam behind Elena Gerasimova and bronze on uneven bars behind Vladislava Urazova and Viktoria Listunova. 

She finished the season competing at the National Youth Games where she won gold in the all-around and on uneven bars ahead of Ou Yushan, silver on floor exercise behind Ou, and bronze in the team final, and she finished seventh on balance beam.

Senior

2020 
In late January it was announced that Wei would make her senior debut at the Stuttgart World Cup taking place in March.  She was replaced by Zhou Ruiyu; however the Stuttgart World Cup was later canceled due to the coronavirus pandemic in Germany.

In September, she competed at the postponed National Championships. In the qualification round, which also served as the team final, Wei debuted upgraded routines on uneven bars, balance beam, and floor exercise to qualify in third place to the all-around final behind defending champion Liu Tingting and Junior Words teammate Guan Chenchen. She also qualified in second place to the balance beam final, behind Guan and ahead of 2018 World Champion Liu, and in sixth place to the uneven bars final. Wei led the Guangxi provincial team to an eight place finish, contributing the top score on every event.

In the all-around final, Wei improved her ranking from qualifications to win the silver medal behind Liu despite a fall on her acrobatic series on beam. Wei recorded the highest uneven bars score  and tied with Qi Qi for the highest all-around score of the day but remained behind Liu in the combined two-day total. Wei expressed satisfaction with her performance despite the fall on beam and said she hoped to learn the double-twisting Yurchenko (DTY) vault to improve her chances of making the Chinese team for the postponed 2020 Summer Olympics. Wei repeated her placements from qualifications in the event finals, placing sixth on uneven bars and winning silver on beam behind Guan.

2021 
Wei was selected to be an alternate at the summer olympics alongside Luo Rui, He Licheng, Liu Tingting and Qi Qi.

She competed at the National Games held in September, representing team Guangxi. Her provincial team did not make the team finals but Wei contributed the highest score on all 4 events. She then qualified for AA finals in 2nd place behind Ou Yushan, Uneven bars final in 2nd behind Fan Yilin and Floor finals in 3rd. Wei won All-around gold by less than 0.100 points ahead of Ou Yushan and Luo Rui. She also received a bronze medal on uneven bars behind 2-time world champion Fan Yilin and Olympian Lu Yufei. Due to a fall on her first tumbling pass and on the double wolf turn, she placed 8th on event finals for floor.

Wei then competed at the 2021 World Championships, she had a fall on the korbut flip on beam and the 2nd pass on floor but qualified for All-around finals in 7th and Uneven bars final in 2nd, behind Brazil's Rebeca Andrade. In the all-around finals, she finished 6th in all-around despite a fall on her uneven bars and a repeated element on floor. On event finals, she bounced back from her previous mistakes and won gold on Uneven bars with a score of 14.733.

2022 
Wei competed at the 2022 Asian Championships in June.  While there she helped China place first as a team, with the highest uneven bars score of the meet of 15.000.  Individually she won gold on the uneven bars with a score of 14.767.

Wei next competed at the Chinese National Championships held in Huanglong, Zhejiang.  She qualified to both the all-around and uneven bars finals. Additionally she helped her team, Guangxi province, to achieve a fourth place finish.  In the all-around final Wei improved significantly and scored the third highest score of the night. After combining scores of both qualifications and finals, Wei settled for fifth place in the all-around.  In the uneven bars final Wei successfully competed her 6.6 difficulty level routine and received the silver medal after losing a tiebreak to fellow 2021 Worlds medalist Luo Rui with a score of 14.966.

Wei was selected to compete at the World Championships where she helped China qualify to the team final and individually she qualified to the uneven bars final.  During the team final Wei put up the highest uneven bars score of the day helping China finish sixth.  During the uneven bars final Wei scored a 14.966 to win the gold and successfully defended her title.

Selected competitive skills

Competitive history

References

External links 

 

Chinese female artistic gymnasts
2004 births
Living people
Gymnasts from Guangxi
Gymnasts from Shanxi
World champion gymnasts
Medalists at the World Artistic Gymnastics Championships
Medalists at the Junior World Artistic Gymnastics Championships
21st-century Chinese women